Sandra Ivonne Sánchez Soriano (born March 20, 1990 in Morelia, Michoacán) is a female judoka from Mexico.

References 

1990 births
Mexican female judoka
Living people
Sportspeople from Morelia
Central American and Caribbean Games silver medalists for Mexico
Central American and Caribbean Games bronze medalists for Mexico
Competitors at the 2010 Central American and Caribbean Games
Competitors at the 2014 Central American and Caribbean Games
Central American and Caribbean Games medalists in judo